"Chans" (Swedish for Chance) is a song by Swedish alternative rock band Kent, released in 2000.

The single has the song Chans, one of two completely new songs from the b-side compilation album B-Sidor 95-00. The second track is an official remix of 747. It was made by the producer of the two new songs; Nåid (also known as Martin Landquist). The sleeve has photos taken by Jonas Linell on the arctic Norwegian island of Svalbard.

Track listing
 Chans
 747 (Nåid 2000 Remix)

Charts

References

2000 singles
Kent (band) songs
2000 songs
RCA Victor singles
Songs written by Joakim Berg